The Canton of L'Ajoupa-Bouillon is a former canton in the Arrondissement of La Trinité on Martinique. It had 1,788 inhabitants (2012). It was disbanded in 2015. The canton comprised the commune of L'Ajoupa-Bouillon.

References

Cantons of Martinique